Operation Inco I  was a World War II operation by the Netherlands East Indies Forces Intelligence Service on the island of Java. On 7 July 1945, the Dutch submarine  landed personnel and supplies of the shore party Inco I at six different places on the coast of the Damar islands.

References 

Military operations involving the Netherlands
Military operations of World War II involving Australia